Iž is an island in the Zadar Archipelago within the Croatian reaches of the Adriatic Sea.

Geography

Geology and topology 

The island is situated between Ugljan on the north-east and Dugi Otok on the south-west. From all islands of Zadar Archipelago, the closest one to Iž is the island of Rava, situated between Iž and Dugi Otok. Iž and Rava are separated by the channel Iški kanal (average wideness about 2.5 km; 1.5 miles). Iž has length of 12.2 km (7.5 miles) and average wideness of 2.5 km (1.5 miles). It has an area of 17.59 square kilometers (6.8 square miles) and a population of 615 (according to 2011 census), so it is considered as one of the small island of Zadar's island group. Length of the coast is 35.1 km (21.8 miles). Iž, like the other islands of Zadar Archipelago, lies in direction northwest–southeast (NW-SE) meaning it is parallel with the mainland. Its mineralogy is composed mainly of limestone and dolomite. The highest peak of the island is Korinjak (height: 168 m; 551 ft). Iž is surrounded by more than 10 very small, uninhabited islands, largest of which is Knežak.

The vegetation of the island is Mediterranean, as on other islands of Zadar, which means that the forests are composed of coniferous trees. Due to the relatively high temperatures, Mediterranean plants are evergreen. The exploitation of forests created a macchia that is richer in flora in the southwestern part of the island (on limestone) than in the northeastern part (on the dolomites). About 60% of the island is covered with pine forest; the first afforestation of the island with aleppo pine begins in the 20th century, more precisely in 1931. The island's oldest and most important cultivated plants are olives, vines and figs.

The main soil types are terra rossa (Croatian: crvenica; crljenica) associated with limestone (cultivated and rich of hummus in the gardens of settlements) and sandy soils on the dolomites.

Settlements are located exclusively on island's eastern part, facing Ugljan. The main settlement, Veli Iž, is situated in the bay on the north-western shore, while Mali Iž is situated on the south-eastern shore and consists of three hamlets - Muće, Makovac and Porovac - located on three hills, below which are two bays – The bay of Knež below Porovac and the bay of Komoševa below Makovac.

Climate 
Iž belongs to the area which has a borderline humid subtropical and Mediterranean climate. Summers are dry, warm or hot and winters are mild and rainy. Average annual air temperature on the island is 15 degrees Celsius (59 degrees Fahrenheit).

The island is relatively low and spatially small so that significant day and night winds can form there. It is relatively far from the mainland, surrounded on all sides by the sea and protected by neighboring higher islands. The most common winds are bora  (Croatian: bura) during winter,  sirocco (Croatian: jugo) during spring, autumn and winter and maestral - a constant humid breeze of moderate intensity - during summer. The strength of bora usually decreases from the mainland towards the open sea; Iž is in the „Srednji kanal“ channel especially protected by Ugljan and Pašman.

The average annual humidity on Iž is about 70% and the annual rainfall is about 880 mm (1989 data).

History 

The island of Iž has been inhabited since prehistoric times; there are traces of an Illyrian hillfort and a Roman settlement. Constantine VII calls it „Ez“ in 10th century. In that time it was under the rule of the Zadar commune, which, as a feud, gave it to the female Benedictine monastery of St. Mary, and later leased to the Zadar aristocracy. Above the bay of Komoševa, at the top of the village of Mali Iž, there is an old romanesque church of St. Mary from the 11th century, circular-shaped with a semicircular apse. It is located right next to the new parish church from the beginning of the 20th century and represents the oldest cultural monument on the island. There are also records of the first Croatian settlers that date from the year 1266.

Since 1409, Iž has been part of the Venetian Republic. In the time of  Venetian-Turkish wars during the 15th and 16th centuries, many refugees from the mainland moved to the island, especially from Ravni Kotari.

Both the parishes of Veli and Mali Iž have a thousand-year Glagolitic history, meaning that from their beginning the Roman Rite in the church was celebrated in the Old Church Slavonic language, not in Latin, from liturgical books written in the old Croatian Glagolitic script. History records more than 200 glagolitic priests on the island and many documents in the Glagolitic alphabet from the 15th to 19th century are still preserved, including manuscripts, printed liturgical books and stone epigraphs. In 2019. a Glagolitic inscription in stone from 1685. was discovered in the family house Švorinić, being among the most recently reveled Glagolitic stone inscriptions in the world.

In the 18th and 19th century Iž became one of the leading maritime and trade centers in the Zadar archipelago.

The castle of the Zadar family Canagietti has been preserved; the castle of the Fanfogna family, originally built in the romanesque style but later rebuilt, was converted into a school in the 19th century.

Economy, culture and tourism 

The small population of the island is mainly engaged into olive cultivation, fishing, viticulture and tourism.

The island also is known for its pottery tradition that has survived to this day: the ethnographic collection of Veli Iž preserves numerous examples of island's authentic ceramics and tools of traditional pottery.

Hotel Korinjak, located in Veli Iž, is the only hotel on the island, also representing the only vegetarian hotel in Croatia. The hotel offers meditation and relaxation therapies for mind and body energy, from yoga to pyramide meditation and orgon or ozon therapies. The hotel also offers boat trips and excursions to island Iž hidden bays or small unsettled nearby islets, where visitors can enjoy untouched nature and beaches.

Veli Iž also has a marina that can accommodate up to two hundred boats and the church of St. Peter and Paul from the 14th century, with elements of romanesque although it is not preserved in its original form.

Traditional festival Iška fešta (lit. "The Fest of Iž") is being held in Veli Iž every year on July 29. The locals then dress in traditional costumes, perform old island dances and songs and prepare local dishes. The highlight of the ceremony is the election of the "King of Iž" (Croatian: Iški kralj) with a term of one year.

The revitalization of the island was greatly contributed by the construction of the main road connecting Mali Iž and Veli Iž - construction of the road started in 1980's by the Yugoslav People's Army. It was fully completed and paved in 1996, stretching in direction northwest–southeast, between Veli Iž and the ferry port in Mali Iž, also connecting Mali Iž hamlets Porovac, Muće and Makovac, together with the bays Knež and Komoševa, by the local roads.

Maritime connections 

Iž is connected with passenger ship and catamaran public lines Zadar – Mali Iž – Veli Iž – Mala Rava – Rava and car ferry line Zadar (Gaženica) – Bršanj (Mali Iž) – Mala Rava – Rava. It is about one hour ship ride from Zadar although catamaran service offers shorter travel time.

The shortest connection of island Iž with Zadar iz through the strait of Mali Ždrelac, nowadays used by all public shipping services which operate to the island.

Before the World War I, all maritime connections between Zadar and Iž were vivid through the island of Ugljan. Since 1892, Iž has a regular steamship connection with Zadar through the strait „Veli Ždrelac“ between islands Ugljan and Rivanj (north-west from Zadar) and from 1980's that connection started to operate through the strait of Mali Ždrelac. Until 2012, only certain amount of smaller ferries connecting Iž and Zadar (as well as ships and catamarans) could sail through Mali Ždrelac, while the rest of the ferries were sailing through Veli Ždrelac strait. In 2012, the strait was deepened which resulted in allowing all ships that sail to the island to pass through. Since 2014, ferries connecting Iž and Zadar (as well as other ferries which connect Zadar with the islands of its archipelago) have been using the port of Gaženica south of Zadar instead of original ferry port that was located in Zadar's town center.

Island's ferry terminal, opened in late 1980's and hosting only a ticket office, is located in the bay of  Bršanj in Mali Iž. It is about 1 km from the center of Mali Iž where all the facilities are. Passenger ships and catamarans, however, use ports of Mali Iž (located in the bay and small settlement Komoševa) and Veli Iž (located in the bay near the promenade by the sea, in the town center).

Notable residents 
Kristo Novoselić, the father of Nirvana bassist Krist Novoselic, lived in Veli Iž before immigrating to the United States.

Nearby islands

References

External links 
 

Islands of Croatia
Islands of the Adriatic Sea